Median household disposable income in the UK was £29,400 in the financial year ending (FYE) 2019, up 1.4% (£400) compared with growth over recent years; median income grew by an average of 0.7% per year between FYE 2017 and FYE 2019, compared with 2.8% between FYE 2013 and FYE 2017.

The rise in median income has occurred during a period where the employment rate grew by 0.5 percentage points, while real total pay for employees increased by an average of 1.0% across the 12 months in FYE 2019 compared with FYE 2018.

Median income of people living in retired households increased by 1.1% (£300), while the median income of people living in non-retired households grew by 1.3% (£400).

Data sources
There are a number of different sources of data on income which results in different estimates of income due to different sample sizes, population types (e.g. whether the population sample includes the self-employed, pensioners, individuals not liable to tax), definitions of income (e.g. gross earnings vs original income vs gross income vs net income vs post tax income).

The Survey of Personal Incomes (SPI) is a dataset from HM Revenue and Customs (HMRC) based on individuals who could be liable to tax. HMRC does not hold information on individuals whose income is below the personal allowance (£8,105 in 2012/13). Furthermore, SPI does not include income from non taxable benefits such as housing benefits or Jobseeker's Allowance.

The Annual Survey of Hours and Earnings (ASHE) is a dataset from an annual survey of approximately 50,000 businesses by the Office for National Statistics (ONS) and covers annual earnings, public and private sector pay differential and the gender pay gap. ASHE does not cover individuals who are self-employed.

The Households Below Average Income (HBAI) dataset is based on the Family Resources Survey (FRS) from the Department for Work and Pensions (DWP). It includes information on equalised household disposable income and can be used to represent the distribution of household income and income inequality (Gini coefficient).

Other data sources include Average Weekly Earnings, Labour Force Survey, Index of Labour Cost per Hour, Unit Labour Costs, Effects of Taxes and Benefits on Household Income / Living Costs and Food Survey, European Union Statistics on Income and Living Conditions, Pensioners Income Series, Wealth and Assets Survey, National Accounts Estimates of Gross Disposable Household Income, and Small Area Income Estimates.

Taxable income

The most recent SPI report (2012/13) gave annual median income as £21,000 before tax and £18,700 after tax. The 2013/14 HBAI report gave median household income (2 adults) as £23,556. The provisional results from the April 2014 ASHE report gives median gross annual earnings of £22,044 for all employees and £27,195 for full-time employees.

According to the OECD the average household net-adjusted disposable income per capita is $27,029 a year (in USD, ranked 14/36 OECD countries), the average household net financial wealth per capita is estimated at $60,778 (in USD, ranked 8/36), and the average net-adjusted disposable income of the top 20% of the population is an estimated $57,010 a year, whereas the bottom 20% live on an estimated $10,195 a year giving a ratio of 5.6 (in USD, ranked 25/36).

The 2013/14 HBAI reported that 15% of people had a relative low income (below 60% of median threshold) before housing costs.

Data from HMRC 2012-13; incomes are before tax for individuals. The personal allowance or income tax threshold was £8,105 (people with incomes below this level did not pay income tax).

Income by location

Income can vary considerably by location. For example, the locations (local administrative unit) with the highest incomes were the City of London, Kensington and Chelsea, and Westminster with median annual incomes of £58,300, £37,800 and £35,200 respectively. The locations with the lowest incomes were Hyndburn, Torbay, and West Somerset with median annual incomes of £17,000, £16,900 and £16,000 respectively.

A 2017 report from Trust for London found that London has a poverty rate of 27%, compared to 21% in the rest of England.

Income by age and gender

Data from the Survey of Personal Incomes 2012/13.

Income by occupation
The tables below shows the ten highest and ten lowest paid occupations in the UK respectively, as at April 2014.

Post-tax household income

Data from the Households Below Average Income (HBAI) report from the Department of Work and Pensions 2013/14:

Data from HMRC – Percentile points of the income distribution as estimated from the Survey of Personal Incomes, note this only includes individuals who pay some income tax:

Wealth

The net worth information is based on data from HMRC for 2004-2005  and includes marketable assets including house equity, cash, shares, bonds and investment trusts. These values do not include personal possessions.

High income

The Institute for Fiscal Studies issued a report on the UK's highest earners in January 2008. There are 42 million adults in the UK of whom 29 million are income tax payers. (The remainder are pensioners, students, homemakers, the unemployed, those earning under the personal allowance, and other unwaged.) A summary of key findings is shown in the table below:

The top 0.1% are 90% male and 50% of these people are in the 45 to 54 year age group. 31% of these people live in London and 21% in South East England. 33% of these people are company directors (as reported to HMRC). 30% work in finance and 38% in general business (includes law). The very richest rely on earnings (salary and bonuses) for 58% of income. Income from self-employment (such as partnerships in law or accountancy firms) accounts for 23% of income and about 18% from investment income (interest and share dividends).

Sources of income

The Family Resources Survey is a document produced by the Department for Work and Pensions. This details income amongst a representative sample of the British population. This report tabulates sources of income as a percentage of total income.

Other social security benefits include: Housing Benefit, Income Support and Jobseeker's Allowance

See also
 Poverty in the United Kingdom
 Taxation in the United Kingdom
 Pension provision in the United Kingdom
 United Kingdom labour law
 Universal basic income in the United Kingdom
 Universal Credit

References

 HMRC statistics – 
 IFS – 

 
UK
Wealth in the United Kingdom
Economic inequality